Pokela is a surname. Notable people with the surname include:

Martti Pokela (1924–2007), Finnish folk musician
John Nyathi Pokela (1922–1985), South African political activist